(Marie) Louis Emberger (23 January 1897 – 30 November 1969) was a French botanist and phytogeographer, at the University of Montpellier.

Life 
Emberger was born at Thann, in Haut-Rhin, France in 1897, which was then part of German occupied Alsace. He developed an interest in Natural History, exploring the Rhine plain of Alsace, and the nearby Vosges mountains. At the age of 17, to avoid conscription into the German army, he escaped to Lyons, in France. There he began studies in biologie at the University of Lyons, and obtained a degree in sciences naturelles in 1918. He obtained his doctorate under Professor Marie Antoine Alexandre Guilliermond, then head of the Department of Agricultural Botany, at Lyons. Following his studies, his first position was as an organic chemistry technician in the Faculty of Medicine and Pharmacy. There he produced his first publication in 1919 in the Bulletin de la Société Botanique de France, an account of his exploration at Grande Chartreuse. He began working as a pharmacist in 1920 and within a year had had six papers presented at the Académie des Sciences by Gaston Bonnier. In 1921 he was appointed as a lecturer in the Faculty of Pharmacy at the University of Montpellier. Within five years he had been appointed head of the botany department at the Institut scientifique de Rabat in Morocco (1926–1936). Returning to France he was, for a short time, professor at the Faculty of Science at Clermont-Ferrand, before once more taking a position in Montpellier, succeeding his step-father, Charles Flahault as head of the botany department (Directeur de l'Institut botanique de l'Université et du Centre d'Etudes phytosocio-logiques de Montpellier). There he worked closely with Josias Braun-Blanquet, also a student of Flahault. He remained in that position until his death  at St Sulpice in Savoie in 1969.

Work 
Emberger's scientific contributions cover four main areas of research, cytology, biogeography, comparative morphology and phylogeny, and biosystematics. His cytological work focussed on the ferns, horsetails,  and the lycopods. His biogeographical work concentrated on the vegetation of the Mediterranean basin and in particular the western High Atlas region of Morocco. He published work on the distribution and classification of Moroccan flora, in particular, halfah grass (Stipa tenacissima). His Moroccan work also included studies on the altitudinal zonation of the mountain regions there and the phytogeography of the desert climate, in particular the argan tree (Argania spinosa). Other work included studies of association in equatorial forests, which led to a biogeographical classification of climate, in which he drew comparisons between Australia and homologous zones of the Mediterranean. In biosystematics he developed a classification scheme for vascular plants.

Selected publications 
 
 
 
 

see also Taxon. Lit., ed. 2 (TL2),

Legacy 
Louis Embeerger is the authority for 168 taxa, such as Agropyron pseudofestucoides Emb.

References

Bibliography 

 
 
 
 
 
 
 
 
 
 
 

20th-century French botanists
1897 births
1969 deaths
Academic staff of the University of Montpellier